Gillian D. Brown (born 1937) is a British linguist. She is known for her expertise on discourse analysis.

Books
 Teaching the Spoken Language
 Discourse Analysis
 Phonological Rules and Dialect Variation: A Study of the Phonology of Lumasaaba
 Performance and Competence in Second Language Acquisition
 Speakers, Listeners and Communication: Explorations in Discourse Analysis
 Questions of Intonation

References

1937 births
Living people
Linguists from England
Women linguists
Pragmaticists
Linguists of English
British phonologists
Academics of the University of Edinburgh
Fellows of Clare College, Cambridge
Discourse analysts